Doni Arifi (born 11 April 2002) is a Finnish professional footballer, who plays as a midfielder for Finnish premier division club Ilves.

References 

2002 births
Living people
Finnish footballers
Association football midfielders
FC Honka players
Pallohonka players
FC Ilves players
Kakkonen players
Veikkausliiga players